The Courier of the King (Italian: Il corriere del re) is a 1947 Italian historical film directed by Gennaro Righelli and starring Rossano Brazzi, Irasema Dilián and Valentina Cortese. It is an adaptation of the 1830 novel The Red and the Black by Stendhal. It was the final film of the veteran director Righelli, who had previously directed a silent version of the story in 1928.

Cast
 Rossano Brazzi as Julien Sorel  
 Irasema Dilián as Mathilde de la Mole  
 Valentina Cortese as Louise de Renal 
 Carlo Ninchi as Il marchese de la Mole  
 Aldo Silvani as Il signor de Renal  
 Laura Carli as La signora Valmod  
 Fiore Davanzati as Emilia  
 Massimo Serato as Maurice Croisenois 
 Camillo Pilotto as Valmod  
 Oreste Fares as L'abate Chenal  
 Armando Francioli as Norbert de la Mole  
 Vittorio Sanipoli as Luz  
 Nerio Bernardi
 Ida Bracci Dorati   
 Magda Forlenza

References

Bibliography 
 Moliterno, Gino. The A to Z of Italian Cinema. Scarecrow Press, 2009.

External links 
 

1947 films
Italian historical drama films
1940s historical drama films
1940s Italian-language films
Films directed by Gennaro Righelli
Films based on French novels
Films based on works by Stendhal
Films set in France
Films set in the 1820s
Italian black-and-white films
1947 drama films
1940s Italian films